Andrew Pink (born 25 January 1983) is a British volleyball player. Born in Kansas City, Missouri, United States, he competed for Great Britain in the men's tournament at the 2012 Summer Olympics.

Pink is a frequent guest of Wandsworth Radio's Saturday afternoon sports show and revealed in a 2 April 2016 interview that the Great Britain Men's Volleyball team hadn't competed since late 2012 due to removal of government funding.

References

External links
 
 
 

1983 births
Living people
British men's volleyball players
Volleyball players at the 2012 Summer Olympics
Olympic volleyball players of Great Britain
Sportspeople from Kansas City, Missouri